Events from the year 1739 in Great Britain.

Incumbents
 Monarch – George II
 Prime Minister – Robert Walpole (Whig)
 Parliament – 8th

Events
 14 January – Britain and Spain sign the Convention of Pardo.
 16 January – first performance of George Frideric Handel's oratorio Saul at the King's Theatre, Haymarket, London.
 February – George Whitefield first preaches in the open air, to miners at Kingswood, South Gloucestershire.
 April – John Wesley first preaches in the open air, at Whitefield's invitation.
 4 April – first performance of Handel's oratorio Israel in Egypt at the King's Theatre, London.
 12 May – John Wesley lays the foundation stone of the New Room, Bristol, the world's first Methodist meeting house.
 17 October – the Foundling Hospital in London, established by Thomas Coram, is granted its royal charter.
 23 October – "War of Jenkins' Ear" (1739–1742) begins when Britain declares war on Spain.
 20–22 November – War of Jenkins' Ear: Battle of Porto Bello: British marine forces capture the Panamanian silver exporting town of Porto Bello from the Spanish.
 25 December–February 1740 – the 'Great Frost': unusually harsh winter in southern England and Ireland.

Publications
 January (dated 9 February) – The Scots Magazine first published.
 David Hume's anonymous A Treatise of Human Nature (issued late 1738 but dated this year).
 John Mottley's pseudonymous Joe Miller's Jests, or the Wits Vade-Mecum.

Births
 6 January – David Dale, philanthropist (died 1806)
 26 January – George Spencer, 4th Duke of Marlborough (died 1817)
 4 February – John Robison, physicist (died 1805)
 25 March – Prince Edward, Duke of York and Albany (died 1767)
 16 May – Henry Howard, 12th Earl of Suffolk, peer and politician (died 1779)
 5 November – Hugh Montgomerie, 12th Earl of Eglinton, peer (died 1819)
 4 December – Henry Temple, 2nd Viscount Palmerston, politician (died 1802)

Deaths
 7 April – Dick Turpin, highwayman (hanged) (born 1705)
 19 April – Nicholas Saunderson, scientist and mathematician (born 1682)
 10 August – William Craven, 3rd Baron Craven, nobleman. (born 1700)
 4 September – George Lillo, playwright (born 1693)
 21 October – William Montagu, 2nd Duke of Manchester (born 1700)

References

 
Years in Great Britain